Shenatal-e Olya (also Romanized as Shenātāl-e ‘Olyā; also known as Shenātāl) is a village in Chahriq Rural District, Kuhsar District, Salmas County, West Azerbaijan Province, Iran. At the 2006 census, its population was 359, in 67 families.

References 

Populated places in Salmas County